Gus is a 2011 Australian computer-animated short film produced by Honeydew Studios in Brisbane, Australia. It is written, directed, animated and produced by Andrew Martin. The music is composed by Liam Flenady and Lisa Cheney, and the sound design is by John Willsteed. It has won multiple awards on the international festival circuit, including Best Short Film Script and Best Short Animation at the Monaco International Film Festival, and Best Animation at the Queensland New Filmmakers Awards in 2011. Gus is Andrew Martin's filmmaking debut and the first production for his company Honeydew Studios.

Synopsis

An adorable young "cave" boy named Gus and his powerful hunter father Don live a cold and isolated life high in the Swiss Alps, banished by their disgruntled tribe because of Gus' chronic explosive flatulence. His flatus is so insidious it repels entire herds and spoils food from afar. Despite all this, his father stands by him until one day, reaching breaking point, he sends Gus out into the cold and unforgiving mountainside to protect their food, a decision that would change life forever...

Awards and nominations

References

External links 
 
 

2011 films
2011 short films
2011 computer-animated films
2010s Australian animated films
2010s animated short films
2010s English-language films
Australian animated short films
Australian computer-animated films
Computer-animated short films
Articles containing video clips
Animated films about cavemen
Animated films about children
Films set in Switzerland
Animated films set in prehistory